Abaid Ullah Baig or Ubaidullah Baig is a Pakistani politician who is member of the Gilgit Baltistan Assembly. He is the Senior Minister in the Cabinet holding the Ministry of Finance, Industries, Commerce and Labour.

Political career

Abaid Ullah Baig contested 2020 Gilgit-Baltistan Assembly election on 15 November 2020 from constituency GBA-6 (Hunza) on the ticket of Pakistan Tehreek-e-Insaf. He won the election by the margin of 2,016 votes over the runner up Independent Noor Muhammad. He garnered 6,600 votes and won it by a good margin.

Previously Abaid Ullah Baig contested the by election in 2016 as independent candidate and lost the election against Shah Salim Khan of ruling party.

Personal & Early life 

He was born on August 18, 1960 in the house of Wazirzada Hifz Ullah Baig. You are the youngest of the brothers but we are five brothers and five sisters. After completing his primary education from Khomer Primary School, he joined Gilgit High School No. 1 in 1972 and continued his education in High School No. 1 till matriculation 1976. ۔ He then traveled to Karachi to continue his education and enrolled in FSC Pre-Engineering at Urdu Science College University Road. Meanwhile, Zulfiqar Ali Bhutto, who was in prison in Pakistan at the time, was sentenced to death. Gone and because of these rest in the country could not take the exam. And returned to Gilgit. Later he got admission in FSC in Government Degree College Gilgit or similarly he qualified for test interview for Ismaili Manpower Program and moved to Shah Karim Hostel and continued his education in Degree College Gilgit. Later, in 1982, he was interviewed for the Pakistan Military Academy Kakul. After complete success from Medical and ISSB, he joined PMA Kakul on November 11 as a Gentleman Cadet and after two years of hard work and training successfully joined a prestigious battalion of Pakistan Army in Punjab Regiment. Received commission as Second Lieutenant on September 5, 1984. And then I retired in the Pakistan Army as a Lieutenant Colonel after 25 years of hard work and service. During this time he served in different parts of Pakistan. Lahore. Bunji-Siah Chan-Quetta-Peshawar. Hyderabad. Perform duties in many places. During the early service, the platoon was stationed in the RA Bazaar area of Lahore. Meanwhile, he went to Quetta Infantry School for basic training which lasted for 6 months and successfully completed his training with good grades. After service in Lahore, he was posted from Unit Lahore to Jim Road Fort Peshawar in 1987, which seems to be with Khyber Agency. Here he rendered outstanding services and conducted passing out parades three times in two years. He also recruited thousands of soldiers and trained them to protect the homeland of the people. Then in April 1992. Okara posting done again. He stayed in Okara cantonment for two years. After that he was posted in Pakistan Rangers Punjab. And 13 Wing Rangers
Wing commanders were posted and then 12 wings Rangers Wing which took place in Kunganpur.
 Operations were carried out and they were successfully completed during which was the biggest success. He was holding 1722 tola (20 sars) of gold. And Pakistan's treasury was deposited in the State Bank. After that he posted again in Hyderabad Cantt and then in Umerkot and Chhor Cantt. He got promotion here after three years of service. After promotion to the rank of Lieutenant Colonel, he was posted to General Headquarters, Rawalpindi. Then, after two years, he joined the Punjab University to pursue higher studies. And after two years at the Institute of Administrative Sciences, Lahore, he did an MPA. In which your main topic was Human Resource Management. From 2004 to 2006 he served as the Administrative Commander (AQ) at Nowshera Station Headquarters. After that he was posted at FCNA Headquarters Gilgit Jotial and retired from here in 2009. After resting for some time, he was appointed Principal of Fuji Foundation Model High School Gilgit. At the same time, he was appointed as the Director of Pakistan Arms Services Board for Gilgit-Baltistan for a period of 3 years. After graduating from here in 2015, he became the Principal of NLC Technical College, Gilgit.

References

Living people
Gilgit-Baltistan MLAs 2020–2025
Politicians from Gilgit-Baltistan
1962 births